is Ali Project's 26th single. This single is set to be released on October 21, 2009 under Mellow Head, a sublabel of Lantis, an anime music company.

The single title was used as the opening theme for the anime series Tatakau Shisho: The Book of Bantorra.

This single will only come in a regular CD only edition. The single's catalog number is LHCM-4070.

Track listing

Charts and sales

References

2009 singles
2009 songs
Ali Project songs
Anime songs